Péter Andorka (born 19 July 1984) is a Hungarian former football player.

Club career
Andorka started his career at Debreceni VSC. Over a four-year period he netted three times in twenty-five games. On 24 January 2005 Andorka moved to Zalaegerszegi TE on a free transfer where he scored three goals in his only season with the club. A short and unsuccessful move to Pécsi MFC followed with Andorka failing to find the net in ten games. This led to his transfer on 26 January 2006 to Szombathelyi Haladás VSE. This was Andorka's most successful spell in club football. Over a four-year period he scored 64 times, endearing himself to the fans in the process.

Andorka currently plays for Kaposvári Rákóczi FC who operate in the second division of Hungarian football.

Despite making appearances for Hungary at youth level, Andorka has failed to break into the senior side at any point during his professional career.

Honours
 Debreceni VSC:
NB I:  Third place: 2002/2003 2003/2004
Hungarian Cup:  Runners-up: 2003
 Szombathelyi Haladás:
NB I:  Third place: 2008/2009
NB II Nyugat:  Winner: 2007/2008

References

External links
Footmercato
HLSZ

1984 births
Living people
People from Veszprém
Hungarian footballers
Hungary youth international footballers
Hungary under-21 international footballers
Association football forwards
Veszprém LC footballers
Szombathelyi Haladás footballers
Debreceni VSC players
Zalaegerszegi TE players
Pécsi MFC players
Nyíregyháza Spartacus FC players
Gyirmót FC Győr players
BFC Siófok players
Szeged-Csanád Grosics Akadémia footballers
Kaposvári Rákóczi FC players
Nemzeti Bajnokság I players
Nemzeti Bajnokság II players
Nemzeti Bajnokság III players
Sportspeople from Veszprém County